Spartacus Educational is a free online encyclopedia with essays and other educational material on a wide variety of historical subjects principally British history from 1700 and the history of the United States.

Based in the United Kingdom, Spartacus Educational was established as a book publisher in 1984 by former history teacher John Simkin and Judith Harris. It became an online publisher in September 1997. It grew into a large database of primary and secondary sources on a wide variety of subjects: World War I, World War II, Russian Revolution, campaign against slavery, Chartism, women's suffrage (biographies of 230 women), Nazi Germany, Spanish Civil War and Cold War. Wherever possible, the history is told, Simkin explained, via the words of the people involved of the people involved in the struggle for equality and democracy. Alan Tucker writing in the blog of the Great War Forum Ltd wrote: “One of the most useful things about Spartacus is the range of secondary sources they use - some very difficult to obtain. Also not all secondary sources - lots of quotes from memoirs, autobiographies and letters… all Spartacus sources are properly acknowledged so you can make up your own mind. I taught an 'A' Level unit where Spartacus has a range of superb material (not Great War)."

For World War II, Simkin describes the focus of this encyclopedia as "providing background information on major political leaders from each of the countries involved in the war ..., including individuals from a miscellaneous category such as: Chaing Kai-Shek and Josip Tito... The site has the ability to provide more of a well-rounded learning experience by illustrating how the war affected people and places all over the world.” The New York Public Library recommended the articles about the history of Germany and Russia as educational resources.

According to Elias, speaking about the assassination of John F. Kennedy, "the site simply reproduces a host of conspiracy theories that first appeared elsewhere". This author also describes the site as "very shoddy, not well-sourced" citing Arthur Goldwag, author of Cults, Conspiracies, and Secret Societies. The blog of Great War Forum Ltd addresses the question 'How reliable a source is Spartacus Educational?'; for the Great War (1914-1918) at least, contributors reached a different assessment.

Monica Burns, an EdTech consultant listed for Edutopia free online resources in history for teaching students how to comprehend informational text. Of Spartacus Educational Burns 2013 wrote: "a great resource for global history. It contains free encyclopedia entries that directly connect to primary source documents, making it a perfect tool for educators looking to give students a starting point in their research.".

References

External links 
 Spartacus Educational website
 Why the name Spartacus Educational?

Book publishing companies of the United Kingdom
British online encyclopedias
Educational book publishing companies
History websites of the United Kingdom
Online encyclopedias